Space Weather is an academic journal about space weather published by the American Geophysical Union. Its editor-in-chief is Noé Lugaz. According to the Journal Citation Reports, the journal has a 2020 impact factor of 4.456.

References

External links 
 

American Geophysical Union academic journals
Space physics journals